Bonkers is an informal British term that means "crazy" or "insane." It may also refer to:

Television 
 Bonkers (American TV series), a 1993–1994 animated series
 Bonkers (British TV series), 2007 comedy
 Bonkers!, a 1979 British TV show
 "Bonkers" (The Price Is Right), a game segment

Music 
 "Bonkers" (song), a song by Dizzee Rascal and Armand Van Helden
 Bonkers (compilation), a happy hardcore compilation album series
 Bonkers (album), the first album in the series

Other 
 Bonkers! (game), a race-style board game
 Bonkers (Sega Genesis video game)
 Bonkers (SNES video game)
 Bonkers candy, by Nabisco

See also 
 
 
 Bonk (disambiguation)